South Goulburn Island Airport  serves the Goulburn Islands, Northern Territory, Australia.

Airlines and destinations

References

Airports in the Northern Territory